Anatoly Sedykh may refer to:
 Anatoli Sedykh (born 1970), Russian footballer
 Anatoly Sedykh (serial killer) (born 1963), Russian serial killer
 Anatoly Sedykh (businessman) (born 1966), Russian businessman